Adelén Rusillo Steen (born 4 November 1996), known professionally as Adelén, is a Spanish-Norwegian singer.

Career

2013–present: Melodi Grand Prix and debut 
Adelén participated in the Norwegian national selection for the Eurovision Song Contest 2013 in Oslo with the Spanish-influenced song "Bombo", written by Ina Wroldsen and Quiz & Larossi and came in second place.

"Bombo" went straight to number 2 on the Norwegian iTunes chart after her performance. It also appeared in VG-lista, the official Norwegian Singles Chart. The song also won the OGAE Second Chance Contest 2013, becoming Norway's third win, and first since 1993. It also won the 2013 Eurodanceweb Award with the highest score ever achieved in the history of the Award (284 points) and the largest distance from the second placed song (exactly 70 points).

In 2013, she signed with Simon Fuller in an attempt to launch her globally. On 21 June 2013 she released another single called  "Baila Conmigo".

In 2014, she recorded "Olé" for the 2014 FIFA World Cup's album One Love, One Rhythm – The 2014 FIFA World Cup Official Album, which went straight to number 1 on the Norwegian iTunes.

In 2015 she released the single "Spell On Me", followed by "Wild Like Me" in 2016. During 2017 two new ones were unveiled; the electropop track "Go Home" and "Big Bad Bitter" with disco influences and an accompanying music video.

In 2018 she signed with Sony Music Norway and released "What's Next", which features an ode to her Spanish roots. A collaboration featuring Colombian duo Kapla y Miky called "Beat" and the "catchy number" with a Latin beat "Somewhere We Can Talk" followed on 2019. In 2021 she delivered her comeback single, the emotional pop ballad "Jaded". It was followed by a dance version of the song and the subsequent singles "Safety Light" and "Obssesed".

Personal life
Born to a Spanish mother and Norwegian father, Adelén was raised in Horten, Norway.

Discography

Singles

As main artist

As featured artist

Awards and nominations

References

External links

Norwegian women singers
Norwegian people of Spanish descent
Norwegian pop singers
1996 births
Norwegian child singers
Living people
Musicians from Tønsberg
Melodi Grand Prix contestants
Dance-pop musicians
English-language singers from Norway
Spanish-language singers of Norway
Spanish child singers
Spanish people of Norwegian descent
Spanish pop singers
21st-century Norwegian singers
21st-century Norwegian women singers
21st-century Spanish singers
21st-century Spanish women singers